Cecelia Ayanori Bukari-Yakubu was a Ghanaian politician. She was the second member of parliament representing the Northern Region and Upper Region from 1960 to 1965 and the member of parliament for Pusiga from 1965 to 1966.

Bukari-Yakubu was among the first women to enter the parliament of Ghana in 1960 under the representation of the people (women members) act. She was among the 10 women who were elected unopposed on 27 June 1960 on the ticket Convention People's Party.

See also
 List of MPs elected in the 1965 Ghanaian parliamentary election

References

Ghanaian MPs 1956–1965
Ghanaian MPs 1965–1966
Convention People's Party (Ghana) politicians